Ramatu Yaradua is the commissioner for Ministry of Investment, Commerce, and Industry in Niger State, Nigeria.

Early life and education 
Rahmatu hails from Enagi village in Edati Local Government Area of Niger State. her Primary Education started at Adrao International School, Lagos,  then to United Kingdom where she attend Ibstock Place School London. She studied International Relations and English at the Coventry University where she obtain a B.A with a second class upper.

Career 
Ramatu started her career as project officer with a contracting company called Platform Nigeria Limited, one of the main contrators of Gwamrimpa Estate, Abuja. She was later promoted to the position of Marketing Manager of the company, where she maintains the efficiency, effectiveness and productivity of the company. After her career with the Platform Limited, Rahmatu joined MicroAccess Limited as Chief Marketing Executive, one of the pioneers in information and communication service providers in Nigeria. While working there, Ramatu managed the company’s largest portfolios such as The National Hospital Abuja, The Corporate Affairs Commission, Ministry of Information, the major oil servicing companies and several other important roles and it is under her leadership that her team developed the first national website for the Federal Republic of Nigeria, the first National Hospital website, and introduced CAC online reducing corporate registration.

Ramatu also served as the Director in the Hamble Group in the United Kingdom, and upon her return to her continent, she served as a Director of Hamble Group (Africa).

Politics 
She was the former Commissioner of Commerce, Industry and Investment, Niger State.

Personal life 
She was married to Alh Murtala Yar’adua, the former Minister of Defence.

External links 

 https://minvestment.nigerstate.gov.ng

References 

Living people
People from Niger State
Nigerian women in politics
Year of birth missing (living people)